The Planalto do Turvo Environmental Protection Area  is an environmental protection area in the state of São Paulo, Brazil.

Location

The Planalto do Turvo Environmental Protection Area (APA) is divided between the municipalities of Barra do Turvo (96.84%) and Cajati (3.16%) in the state of São Paulo.
It is in the Atlantic Forest biome.
About 40% of the APA is covered by dense and mixed rainforest in various stages of succession.

History

The Planalto do Turvo Environmental Protection Area was created by state law 12.810 of 21 February 2008.
This law broke up the old Jacupiranga State Park and created the Jacupiranga Mosaic with 14 conservation units.

Economy

There are 374 families resident in the APA, mostly migrants from other regions but some long-established.
The soil is relatively infertile, and the main economic activity is raising cattle for beef and milk. 
There is some infrastructure along highway BR-116 such as small businesses, a school and a health center.

Notes

Sources

Environmental protection areas of Brazil
Protected areas established in 2008
Protected areas of São Paulo (state)
2008 establishments in Brazil